Sione Tui (born 8 July 1999) is an Australian rugby union player who plays for Stade Français. His position of choice is wing. At international level, he represented Australia Under-20s in the 2019 Oceania Rugby Under 20s Championship, in which Australia finished the tournament as champions.

References

Super Rugby statistics

Australian rugby union players
Living people
1999 births
Stade Français players
Rugby union wings
Rugby union fullbacks
Melbourne Rising players
Melbourne Rebels players
Australian expatriate rugby union players
Expatriate rugby union players in France
Rugby union centres
US Carcassonne players